Wiswell Inlet is a body of water in Nunavut's Qikiqtaaluk Region in Canada. It lies in eastern Frobisher Bay, forming a wedge into Baffin Island's Blunt Peninsula. There are several islands at the mouth of the inlet.

References

Inlets of Baffin Island